Central United Methodist Church is the first Protestant church in the Philippines, located along T.M. Kalaw Street, Ermita, Manila. Founded on 5 March 1899 during the American Occupation, it was originally named Central Methodist Episcopal Church. The church was originally designed by Juan Arellano.

History
The church's history is closely intertwined with that of Knox United Methodist Church mainly because the two churches were the result of Filipino-American ties during the surrender of Manila in 1898. Thereafter, the first Protestant worship service in the Philippines was held on 28 August 1898 and was officiated by Rev. George C. Stull, attended by both American soldiers and Filipino civilians.

During the Philippine–American War, the congregation separated itself from the American component, who transferred its services to the YMCA and was organised in 1899.

Its first chapel was completed on December 23, 1901 and was replaced by a structure made of stone in November 1906. In 1932, it was elevated to a cathedral. During the Liberation of Manila in 1945, the Central UMC was severely damaged and rendered unusable by the fighting between the combined Filipino and American troops and the Japanese Imperial forces. Its congregation reunited with Knox UMC until 1949, when Central UMC was rebuilt in its original site along T.M. Kalaw Street.

Since then, membership of Central UMC has shifted rapidly from a predominantly American to a mixed Filipino and American demographic.

Location
Central UMC is located in T.M. Kalaw Avenue corner Taft Avenue, Manila, across from Plaza Olivia Salamanca.

Famous Congregants
 José Abad Santos, former Chief Justice and acting President of the Philippines, 1942
 Jorge Bocobo, former Justice of the Supreme Court of the Philippines, 1942-44

Gallery

See also
 Cosmopolitan Church
 The United Methodist Church
 Philippines Central Conference (United Methodist Church)
 Knox United Methodist Church

References

 National Historical Institute. Historical Markers: Metropolitan Manila. Manila: National Historical Institute, 1993.
 "History of Knox UMC: 1898-2005." Knox United Methodist Church, 2005. https://web.archive.org/web/20080607181801/http://www.knoxumc.com/history.htm (Accessed on September 11, 2007).

External links

Official site of Central United Methodist Church
Pinoy Metodista - United Methodist Church in the Philippines
Official website of The UMC - Manila Episcopal Area
Official website of The UMC - Baguio Episcopal Area
The Story of Methodism in the Philippines

United Methodist Church
United Methodist Annual Conferences
Churches in Manila
Buildings and structures in Ermita
Gothic Revival church buildings in the Philippines
Cultural Properties of the Philippines in Metro Manila
Methodism in Asia
Juan M. Arellano buildings
Neoclassical church buildings in the Philippines